The National Museum of Transportation (NMOT) is a private, 42-acre transportation museum in the Kirkwood suburb of St. Louis, Missouri. Founded in 1944, it restores, preserves, and displays a wide variety of vehicles spanning 15 decades of American history: cars, boats, aircraft, and in particular, locomotives and railroad equipment from around the United States. The museum is also home to a research library of transportation-related memorabilia and documents.

At the southwest corner of the property is West Barretts Tunnel. Built in 1853, it is one of a pair of tunnels that were the first to operate west of the Mississippi River. It was added to the National Register of Historic Places in 1978.

The museum has its own railway spur to an active main line formerly owned by the Missouri Pacific Railroad, now by the Union Pacific Railroad. This has allowed the museum to take possession of large and unusual pieces of railroad equipment.  A miniature railroad operates around a loop of track near the parking lot and a full-sized restored trolley operates Thursday–Sunday from April through October.

Vehicles and equipment

Railroad

Among its railroad items are:
 Aerotrain No. 3
 The only surviving Milwaukee Road class EP-2 Bi-Polar Electric.
 Union Pacific Big Boy #4006.
 Norfolk & Western Y6a class 2-8-8-2 No. 2156
 Union Pacific Centennial #6944. One of the final Centennial locomotives built.
 Southern Pacific class GS-6 "War Baby" #4460.
 Atchison, Topeka & Santa Fe 2-10-4 #5011.
 Chesapeake & Ohio K-4 #2727
 Baltimore and Ohio Railroad #50.  The only surviving EMC 1800 hp B-B locomotive
 EMD FT #103, the first F-unit built, a National Engineering Landmark.
 Delaware, Lackawanna, and Western 4-4-0C #952, one of two DL&W steam locomotives and one of five Camelbacks in existence.
 Erie Lackawanna EMD SD45 #3607.
 Missouri-Kansas-Texas 4-4-0 #311, the sole surviving M-K-T steam locomotive.
 Chicago & Illinois Midland 2-8-2 #551, the sole surviving C&IM steam locomotive.
 Ferrovie dello Stato Italiane (Italian State Railroad) E550.025 electric locomotive.
 New York Central 4-8-2 #2933, one of two surviving examples of large NYC steam power.
 Wabash 2-6-0 #573, one of only two Wabash steam locomotives in existence.
 Union Pacific 900081, a rotary snowplow.
 The Whale, largest tank car ever built.
 A PRR P5 electric locomotive #4700.
 Chicago, Burlington and Quincy Railroad #9908 Silver Charger, the locomotive of the General Pershing Zephyr.
 Frisco 1522, used in excursion service from 1988 to 2002.
 Frisco 1621, a sister to 1630 at the Illinois Railway Museum in Union, Illinois.
 A PRR GG1 electric locomotive #4918.
 Chicago and Northwestern 4-4-2 #1015, the only surviving Chicago and North Western class D Atlantic.
 New York, Chicago and St. Louis Railroad 4-6-4 #170, the only surviving Nickel Plate L1a Hudson.
 Hyperloop One ∞ XP-2

Automobiles

The Earl C. Lindburg Automotive Center contains 25 vehicles, including:
 1908 Galloway Express truck
 1901 St. Louis Motor Carriage Company car
 1963 Chrysler Turbine Car
 1964½ Ford Mustang
 1915 Ford Model T
 Bobby Darin's Dream Car a DiDia 150
 St. Louis-built Automobile Gallery.
 1941 Cadillac Fleetwood Fleetwood Series 60 Special Sedan (featured in front of a rescued and restored unit from the nearby Coral Court Motel)

Other road vehicles
 1977 Mack RS712LST used in the 1978 film, Convoy. including its on-road movie double, and the only original remaining tank trailer used in the film.

Boats and aircraft
On display are a Missouri River towboat and two airplanes: a C-47 Skytrain at the main gate and a T-33 Shooting Star.

In 2021, the museum opened a permanent exhibition of some 100 model airplanes donated by Sanford McDonnell, each with a connection to the McDonnell Aircraft Corporation.

See also

List of United States railroads
List of Missouri railroads
List of railway museums

References

External links 

 National Museum of Transportation – Official Website
 HawkinsRails photographs

Missouri railroads
Maritime museums in Missouri
Railroad museums in Missouri
Aerospace museums in Missouri
Automobile museums in Missouri
Museums in St. Louis County, Missouri
1944 establishments in Missouri
Tourist attractions in St. Louis